The following is a timeline of the history of the city of Curitiba, Paraná (state), Brazil.

Prior to 20th century

 1668 - Igreja de Nossa Senhora da Luz (church) built.
 1693 - Village settlement named "Vila da Nossa Senhora da Luz dos Pinhais."
 1721 - Village renamed "Curitiba."
 1780 - Population: 2,949.
 1854 - Curitiba becomes capital of Paraná.
 1872 - Population: 12,651.
 1874 - Arsenal built.
 1886 -  (park) opens.
 1890 - Population: 24,553.
 1892 - Catholic Diocese of Curitiba established.
 1893 -  built.
 1900 - Population: 49,755.

20th century

 1909 - Coritiba Foot Ball Club formed.
 1912 - Federal University of Paraná established.
 1919 - Gazeta do Povo newspaper begins publication.
 1920 - Population: 78,986.
 1924 - Clube Atlético Paranaense football team formed.
 1947 - Estádio Vila Capanema (stadium) opens.
 1950
 June: Part of 1950 FIFA World Cup held in city.
 Population: 138,178.
 1951 -  newspaper begins publication.
 1953 -  inaugurated.
 1954
  (library) building and Teatro Guaíra (theatre) open.
  becomes mayor.
 1956 -  newspaper begins publication.
 1960 - Population: 356,830.
 1962 -  built.
 1966 - Institute of Urban Planning and Research of Curitiba founded.
 1967 - Flag design adopted.
 1968 - Curitiba Master Plan adopted.
 1970
  established.
 Population: 483,038 city; 583,857 urban agglomeration.
 1971
  (theatre) opens.
 Jaime Lerner becomes mayor.
 1972 - Rua XV de Novembro pedestrianized.
 1973 -  established.
 1974 - Rede Integrada de Transporte (transit system) begins operating.
 1976 - Iguaçu Park opens.
 1980
 5 July: Catholic pope visits city.
 Population: 1,025,079.
 1985 -  founded.
 1988 -  established.
 1989
 City recycling program and Paraná Clube football team established.
 Perhappiness poetry event begins.
 1991
 Botanical Garden of Curitiba opens.
 Rua 24 Horas shopping mall in business.
 Population: 1,313,094.
 1992
 Wire Opera House opens.
 World Cities Forum held in Curitiba.
 Bairro Novo developed.
 1993 - Population: 1,364,320 (estimate).
 1999 - Arena da Baixada opens.
 2000 - Population: 1,586,848.

21st century

 2002 - New Museum opens.
 2003 - City designated an American Capital of Culture.
 2008 - Mormon temple built.
 2010 - Population: 1,751,907.
 2012 - 7 October:  held.
 2013 -  becomes mayor.
 2014 - June: Part of 2014 FIFA World Cup held in city.
 2016 - 2 October:  held.

See also
 
 List of mayors of Curitiba

References

This article incorporates information from the Portuguese Wikipedia.

Bibliography

in English

in Portuguese

External links

Curitiba
curitiba
curitiba